Teresa is a 1951 American romantic drama film directed by Fred Zinnemann and starring Pier Angeli and John Ericson. The film's screenplay was written by Stewart Stern based on a story he wrote with Alfred Hayes, for which they were nominated for an Academy Award for Best Story.

Plot
Phillip Cass, a sensitive young man, is saddled with a mother from hell. While fighting in Italy during World War II, he marries a sweet, young Italian woman (Pier Angeli) who might be able to change his life and satisfy his desire to be loved.  Readjustment proves difficult as the young couple have to share a New York apartment with his parents and sister, while Philip feels a failure at menial jobs.  The birth of a baby finally gives the couple new hope.

Cast
 Pier Angeli as Teresa Russo
 John Ericson as Philip Cass
 Patricia Collinge as Mrs. Clara Cass 
 Richard Bishop as Mr. Cass 
 Peggy Ann Garner as Susan Cass
 Ralph Meeker as Sgt. Dobbs
 Bill Mauldin as Grissom
 Ave Ninchi as Teresa's Mother
 Edward Binns as Sgt. Brown
 Rod Steiger as Frank
 Aldo Silvani as Professor Crocce
 Tommy Lewis as Walter
 Franco Interlenghi as Mario
 Lee Marvin as G.I. (uncredited)

Reception
According to MGM records, the film made $743,000 in the United States and Canada, and $1,004,000 elsewhere, recording a profit of $421,000.

References

External links
 
 
 
 

1951 films
1951 romantic drama films
American romantic drama films
American black-and-white films
Films directed by Fred Zinnemann
Films set in Italy
Films set in New York City
Italian Campaign of World War II films
Metro-Goldwyn-Mayer films
Films scored by Louis Applebaum
Films with screenplays by Stewart Stern
1950s English-language films
1950s American films